Robert Zwinkels (born 4 May 1983) is a Dutch footballer who plays as a goalkeeper.

Club career
Zwinkels' career began when he signed a professional contract with ADO Den Haag, making his first team appearance in 2006, at the age of 23. In summer 2020 he extended his contract with the club and started what became his 16th season at the club making him by far the longest serving Eredivisie player with the same club.

Career statistics

References

External links
 
 
 Voetbal International profile 

1983 births
Living people
People from Wateringen
Dutch footballers
Association football goalkeepers
Eredivisie players
Eerste Divisie players
ADO Den Haag players
Footballers from South Holland